The Yook Woo dang Literary Award (Korean:육우당 문학상; hanja:六友堂文學賞) and  The Yookwoodang memorial Prize, Prize of Yookwoodang is one of South Korean Literature Award and established as a memorial to Yun Hyon-seok on Dongdaemun in Seoul, April 1, 2013. Yun Hyon-seok was a South Korean Human rights activist and Gay poet, writer and critic.

Yun's dream as a poet and writer was for a renaissance and resurrection of Korean traditional poet and literary creation. his one's life, he was early time until his death, writing to more poetry and prose. His work was rejected, because he was Gay. Ten years after his death, Solidarity for LGBT Human Rights of Korea (동성애자인권연대 同性愛者人權連帶) and LGBT Human right activists,  some South Korean Civil activists was established for his memorial.

The application eligibility is unlimited, and accepts a variety of genres, including poetry, fiction, essays.

References

Site link 
 “이름 없이 죽어간 성소수자 기억해 주세요” 미디어스 2013.04.26. 
 “동성애는 사람이 사람 좋아하는 문제… 이상한가요” 서울신문 2013.04.23. 
 한 번도 ‘우리의 이름’으로 장례를 치르지 못했어요

Awards established in 2013
International literary awards
Literary awards honoring writers
South Korean literary awards
Literary awards honouring young writers